Andy Mulligan is an English writer best known for young adult fiction. His work is strongly influenced by his experiences working as a volunteer in Calcutta, India, and as an English and drama teacher in Brazil, Vietnam, the Philippines, and the UK

Career
Mulligan's first novel, Ribblestrop, was published by Simon & Schuster in 2009. The story originated "on a walk with a fellow teacher"; they talked about they might turn a particular "ramshackle stately home ... into a thoroughly inappropriate school".

His second novel, Trash, is set in the garbage dump of a large unnamed third world city reminiscent of Manila,  and features a street child who lives as a waste picker. It was shortlisted for one of the annual Blue Peter Book Awards, but dropped "because it contains scenes of violence and swearing that are not suitable for the younger end of" the Blue Peter audience. David Fickling, the publisher of Trash, stated that "poor children live a very unpleasant life and to avoid that would be untruthful, and I don't think one should be untruthful to children. You can't make life wonderfully safe and middle-class all over the world." Trash was later shortlisted for the 2012 CILIP Carnegie Medal. A film adaptation of Trash by Working Title Films and PeaPie Films is in development.

Return to Ribblestrop (2011) was the first of two Ribblestrop sequels. Mulligan won the 2011 Guardian Children's Fiction Prize, a once-in-a-lifetime book award judged by a panel of British children's writers. "It is so fresh: the judges loved its anarchy, its good humour, its warm heart and the way it depicted children," according to committee chair Julia Eccleshare, children's book editor

Works 

Ribblestrop (Simon & Schuster Children's Books, 2009)
Trash (David Fickling Books, 2010)
Return to Ribblestrop (Simon & Schuster, 2011)
Ribblestrop Forever! (Simon & Schuster, 2012)
The Boy With Two Heads  (RHCP Digital, 2013)
Liquidator  (David Fickling Books, 2015)
Rollercoaster:(Adventure Book Box, 2016)Dog (Pushkin Children's Books, 2017

 Awards 

 2011 Guardian Children's Fiction Prize for Return to Ribblestrop Ribblestrop was shortlisted for a Roald Dahl Funny Prize in 2009. Trash'' was shortlisted for the CILIP Carnegie Medal in 2012.

See also

Notes

References

External links 
 
 Andy Mulligan at Simon & Schuster publisher

English children's writers
Guardian Children's Fiction Prize winners
Living people
Year of birth missing (living people)